Typecast is a Filipino emo rock band from the Philippines. 
Originally an underground act, they have surfaced on the mainstream Philippine music scene, while managing to hold on to their underground roots.

Career
Laguna has been home to hardcore punk bands since the early 1990s. Brought up in a DIY community, the band came together in 1999, initially doing cover versions, after that they started doing their own songs. In 2004, they released their debut studio album, The Infatuation Is Always There, which paved their way to become one of the most influential rock bands in Southeast Asia. With the release of their second studio album, Every Moss and Cobweb, in 2007, the band changed their sound from gritty to melancholic lyrics that turned out to be emo. The band broke into the local mainstream with the single, "Will You Ever Learn", which won Best Song of the Year at the 2007 NU Rock Awards. This success eventually led to the opportunity to open for other popular bands such as Thursday, Darkest Hour, Good Charlotte, Saosin, Anberlin, All Time Low, Dashboard Confessional, The Used, and Cobra Starship. In March 2013, Steve Badiola recorded a tribute to Karl Roy with Ian Rondilla which is entitled “Missed”. The track was recorded at Tower of Doom Studios. In 2014, drummer Melvin Macatiag was removed from the band and was replaced by Sep Roño in 2015.  For the 1st time in Typecast band history, a new 1st tagalog song Typecast was released their very 1st tagalog song called "Mulat Ng Mata" released in 2019 and is available on digital platforms worldwide like Spotify, YouTube Music, Apple Music & Deezer.

Critical reception
Typecast pioneered the social networking website as a venue for independent music in Southeast Asia and holds the most number of friends and fans in the area. They've been reviewed as one of the Most Influential Rock Bands in Southeast Asia according to Magmug.com, an online magazine based in Singapore and Malaysia.

Musical styles
The band's sound emphasizes on alternative rock, pop punk, post-hardcore and emo, which marked them in the country's rock music scene. Having often been mistaken for an American band, even Geoff Rickly of the band Thursday said that the band reminds him of the post-rock band Explosions in the Sky. In addition, Badiola's voice has also been compared to Chris Carrabba's voice.

Discography

Last Time (2002)
The Infatuation Is Always There (2004)
Every Moss and Cobweb (2006)
How Your Influence Betrays You (2011)
Word Sits Heavy (2014)

Members

Current members 
Steve Frank Badiola – lead vocals, guitars (1999–present)
Chi Resurreccion – co-vocals, bass guitar (2003–present)
Pakoy Fletchero – lead guitar, backing vocals (2005–present)
Sep Roño – drums (2015–present)

Past members

Melvin Macatiag – drums (1999–2014)
Ryan Ronquillo – bass (1999–2002)

Awards and nominations

References

External links
Official site
MySpace page

Filipino rock music groups
Post-hardcore groups
Post-grunge groups
Musical groups established in 1999
1999 establishments in the Philippines